This is a list of animated films produced in Albania during the 1970s.

Animated films
 Vajza me pata (1975)
 Zana dhe Miri (1975)
 Kalleza e grurit (1976)
 Lisharesi (1976)
 Majlinda dhe zogu i vogël (1976)
 Pika e ujit (1976)
 Festa e pranverës (1977)
 Oreksi i humbur (1977)
 Shoferi i vogël (1977)
 Zhgaravinat (1977)
 Aksioni dhe lodrat (1978)
 Katër fotografitë (1978)
 Ketri ndihmon shokun (1978)
 Mirela (1978)
 Shqiponja dhe Sokoli (1978)
 Arushi hap tokë të re (1979)
 Erinda dhe kukulla (1979)
 Gishto trimi (1979)
 Llustra Llustra (1979)
 Mullari që vrapon (1979)

References

Lists of animated films
Lists of Albanian films